Prima Donna is a double album recording of Rufus Wainwright's 2009 opera of the same name, released internationally by the German classical record label Deutsche Grammophon (Universal Music Group) on September 11, 2015 and on October 2, 2015 in Canada, Mexico, and the United States. The recording features performances by Janis Kelly, Kathryn Guthrie, Antonio Figueroa, Richard Morrison, and Jayce Ogren conducting the BBC Symphony Orchestra. The album's release coincided with Prima Donna: A Symphonic Visual Concert.

Track listing

Track listing adapted from Deutsche Grammophon.

Personnel
 BBC Symphony Orchestra
 Antonio Figueroa
 Kathryn Guthrie
 Janis Kelly
 Richard Morrison
 Jayce Ogren

Credits adapted from Deutsche Grammophon.

References

External links
 Prima Donna: The Albumat PledgeMusic 

2015 albums
Deutsche Grammophon albums
French-language albums
Opera recordings
Rufus Wainwright albums
Universal Music Group albums